This was the first edition of the tournament.

Aleksandra Krunić and Katarzyna Piter won the title, defeating Arantxa Rus and Mayar Sherif in the final, 6–4, 6–2

Seeds

Draw

Draw

References
Main Draw

Zed Tennis Open - Doubles